Saint-Thierry is a commune in the Marne department in north-eastern France.

History
The village is named after Saint Thierry of Mont d'Hor, who founded the Saint-Thierry Abbey.
William of Saint-Thierry was elected abbot here in 1119. It was here that he wrote De natura et dignitate amoris ("On the Nature and Dignity of Love") and De contemplando Deo ("On the Contemplation of God"). 
On 16 April 1917 Saint-Thierry was the site of one of the soviets of the Russian Revolution when soldiers of the 1st Brigade of the Russian Expeditionary Force in France formed a soldiers committee on learning of the February Revolution.

See also
Communes of the Marne department

References

Saintthierry
Mutinies